The 2017–18 HT Premijer liga was the 27th season of the HT Premijer liga, the highest professional basketball league in Croatia. It started on 6 October 2017 and finished on 3 June 2018. 

Cedevita retained the title and achieved their fifth league overall.

Format
As in the previous season, all participants in A-1 League including teams that play ABA League joined the regular season. It was played with a double round-robin format where the eight first qualified teams joined the playoffs while the last qualified one was relegated.

Current teams

After the resign of Jolly Šibenik to its berth, the league was reduced to 13 teams. Jazine and Ribola Kaštela were promoted from the previous season. They would replace Gorica and Kvarner 2010.

Regular season

League table

Playoffs
Quarterfinals and semifinals were played in a best-of-three-games format, while the finals in a best-of-five one (1-3-5).

Quarterfinals

|}

Semifinals

|}

Finals

|}

References

External links
Official Site 
Scoresway Page
Eurobasket.com League Page

A-1 Liga seasons
Croatian
A1